Cassiel Rousseau (born 4 February 2001) is an Australian diver. He competed in the 2020 Summer Olympics in the men's 10 metre platform.

Early life and career

Rousseau is the grandson of French cyclist Michel Rousseau, who won gold in the men's sprint at the 1956 Summer Olympics. He was an acrobatic gymnast and began diving in 2017.

In June 2022, he was named in the Australian diving team for the 2022 Commonwealth Games. He won a gold medal in the Men's 10 metre platform event and bronze medals in the mixed synchronised 10 metre platform event alongside Emily Boyd and the men's synchronised 10 metre platform alongside Domonic Bedggood.

Competitive history

References

2001 births
Living people
Australian male divers
Olympic divers of Australia
Divers at the 2020 Summer Olympics
Divers at the 2022 Commonwealth Games
Commonwealth Games medallists in diving
Commonwealth Games gold medallists for Australia
Commonwealth Games bronze medallists for Australia
Sportspeople from Brisbane
Sportsmen from Queensland
Australian people of French descent
21st-century Australian people
Medallists at the 2022 Commonwealth Games